Vukovar-Srijem County, Vukovar-Sirmium County or Vukovar-Syrmia County, named after the eponymous town of Vukovar and the region of Syrmia, is the easternmost Croatian county. It includes the eastern parts of the region of Slavonia and the western parts of the region of Syrmia, as well as the lower Sava river basin, Posavina and Danube river basin Podunavlje. Due to the overlapping definitions of geographic regions, division on Slavonia and Syrmia approximately divides the county vertically into north-west and south-east half, while division on Posavina and Podunavlje divides it horizontally on north-east and south-west half.

The county's seat is in Vukovar, a town on the Danube river while its biggest town and economic and transportation center is in Vinkovci, town with 33,328 inhabitants. Vinkovci served as an temporary de facto seat of the county during the Croatian War of Independence with some institutions still remaining in the town as of 2020. In 2011 the entire population of the county was 180,117. Other than Vukovar and Vinkovci, settlements with town status are Ilok, Otok and Županja. Vukovar-Srijem County is ethnically most diverse county in Croatia with Croat majority and significant Serb, Hungarian, Pannonian Rusyns, Bosniak, Ukrainian and Slovak communities.

The county was one of the most affected regions by the Croatian War of Independence and today belongs to the group of the least developed counties in Croatia with significant part of it being classified as an Areas of Special State Concern.

Name
The name of the Vukovar-Srijem County is derived from the name of its seat town of Vukovar and the standard Croatian name of the region of Syrmia. The name is formed out of the possessive adjective for the two eponymous with literal English translation being the Vukovarian-Syrmian County. The larger historical Syrmia County also covered large parts of modern Serbia and the easternmost part of Brod-Posavina County (see § Habsburg Empire and Austria-Hungary).

Name in other languages 

History

Pre-Roman history
The area of the county has been inhabited since Neolithic times famous for its Vučedol culture and La Tène culture sites. It includes exceptionally rich archaeological sites, listed among the most important sites of southern Europe many of which are preserved today at the Vučedol Culture Museum.

Roman Sirmium
During the classical times the Danube river was a part of the Danubian Limes. It was a birthplace of Roman emperors Valentinian I and Valens while the entire region was oriented towards the nearby Sirmium, a city declared one of four capitals of the Roman Empire in 294.

Middle Ages

Ottoman period
During the Ottoman Hungary period the region was a pat of the Sanjak of Syrmia with seat in contemporary town of Ilok.

Habsburg Empire and Austria-Hungary

The Ottoman Empire retreated from the region after the signing of the 1699 Treaty of Karlowitz. The region became a part of the Habsburg Kingdom of Slavonia and Slavonian Military Frontier as part of the Habsburg Monarchy (until 1804), Austrian Empire (1804–1867) and Austria-Hungary (1867–1918).

The historical Slavonian Syrmia County, with its seat also in Vukovar, existed for most of the period between 1745 and 1922.

During the revolutions of 1848 in the Austrian Empire the historical county and parts of the Military Frontier, including most of modern Vukovar-Srijem County, briefly became part of the short-lived self-declared Serbian Vojvodina. In the aftermath, from 1849, the Military Frontier was restored and the historical county was split: the eastern part became part of the Neusatz (Novi Sad) district of the Voivodeship of Serbia and Banat of Temeschwar crown land; the western part, which broadly corresponded to the northern part of modern Vukovar-Srijem County, including Vukovar, was merged into the Essek (Osijek) county of Slavonia. The border between the two was broadly similar, but not identical, to the modern Croatia-Serbia border; notably, Ilok lay just to the east of the border, and it ran through was is today Bapska, dividing Bapska-proper (in Neusatz) and Novak (in Essek).

In 1860 the pre-1848 divisions, including the historical Syrmia County, were restored.

In 1881 the Slavonian Military Frontier was abolished and large parts of it were merged into Syrmia County. Between 1881 and 1922 it covered the contemporary county and the area of modern-day Srem District (except Mačvanska Mitrovica), Zemun, Surčin and New Belgrade subdivisions of Belgrade, easternmost parts of Brod-Posavina County and Petrovaradin, Beočin, Neštin, Vizić and Sremski Karlovci.

World War I

Kingdom of Yugoslavia
Some of the villages in the region were settled by Salonica front Serbian soldiers and families as an reward for their contribution to war efforts.

The old Habsburg Syrmia County remained a subdivision of the Kingdom of Serbs, Croats and Slovenes (Yugoslavia from 1929) until 1922; it then became an oblast (with the same borders) until 1929. From 1929 it was split between the Sava and Danube Banovinas until 1939; the modern Vukovar-Srijem County was mostly contained with Sava Banovina. In 1939 Sava Banovina was merged into the Banovina of Croatia and its borders extended, encompassing all of the modern county.

World War II

During World War II the region was part of the Nazi puppet Independent State of Croatia, mostly within Vuka County, with southern parts falling within Posavje County. The puppet state and Nazi forces conducted criminal policy of Holocaust, Genocide of Serbs in the Independent State of Croatia and Romani genocide by destruction of Vinkovci Synagogue, devastation of Vukovar Synagogue, Dudik Killings, Ivanci massacre and other crimes in the region. Yugoslav Partisans, Europe's most effective anti-Axis resistance movement, was active at the Fruška Gora mountain and in villages alongside Zagreb–Belgrade railway (today M105 railway). The region was liberated after the Syrmian Front was broken.

Socialist Federal Republic of Yugoslavia
In the period of the Socialist Republic of Croatia Vukovar became an important industrial center. For a long period during the existence of the Socialist Republic of Croatia the area of the modern day county was organized in three municipalities of Vinkovci, Vukovar and Županja. At the time Croatian municipalities were on average significantly larger units (both in territory and population) than contemporary municipalities of Croatia.

Croatian War of Independence

The Battle of Vukovar was an 87-day siege of Vukovar by the Yugoslav People's Army (JNA), supported by various paramilitary forces from Serbia, between August and November 1991. Before the Croatian War of Independence the Baroque town was a prosperous, mixed community of Croats, Serbs and other ethnic groups. As Yugoslavia began to break up, Serbia's President Slobodan Milošević and Croatia's President Franjo Tuđman began pursuing nationalist politics. In 1990, an armed insurrection was started by Croatian Serb militias, supported by the Serbian government and paramilitary groups, who seized control of Serb-populated areas of Croatia. Battle of Borovo Selo was one of the first armed clashes which led to the War. Despite the battle the events in Eastern Slavonia developed slower than in Krajina and were under much stronger and more direct influence from the central government in Belgrade. They however led to the establishment of self-proclaimed SAO Eastern Slavonia, Baranja and Western Syrmia which subsequently joined the as well self-declared Republic of Serbian Krajina. The region was ethnically cleansed of its Croat and some other non-Serb population leading to some of the most serious violation of human rights including Erdut killings, Lovas killings, Dalj massacre, Tovarnik massacre, Vukovar massacre and other crimes. Within the Republic of Serbian Krajina there was no direct physical connection between the Krajina and Eastern Slavonia, and no later than 1994 there was effective detachment and schism between Pale-aligned and more hardline Knin administration and more compromising and Belgrade aligned Vukovar administration. Complete military defeat of Krajina during the Operation Storm and perception that similar or more devastating fate may follow up in Eastern Slavonia increased willingness to compromise and commitment on all sides to pursue peaceful resolution of the conflict. As the result of the War Vukovar became known in majority Croat community as the Hero City and is today a common emotional patriotic or nationalist reference commemorated officially as a Remembrance Day public holiday on November 18.

United Nations administration
On 12 November 1995 Erdut Agreement between the authorities of the Republic of Croatia and the local Serb authorities of the Eastern Slavonia, Baranja and Western Syrmia was reached enabling peaceful resolution to the Croatian War of Independence in eastern Croatia. The agreement was acknowledged by the United Nations Security Council in its Resolution 1023 and subsequent resolutions dealing with the newly established United Nations Transitional Administration for Eastern Slavonia, Baranja and Western Sirmium. The mission successfully demilitarized the region and returned it to government's control over the two year period. It enabled the return of Croat refugees and provided inter-communal power-sharing mechanisms in police and other institutions as well as the establishment of minority institutions such as the Serb National Council and regional Joint Council of Municipalities.

Contemporary period
In the aftermath of the direct United Nations Administration OSCE Mission to Croatia was present in the region.

Geography
Vukovar-Srijem County lies in the far northeastern part of Croatia, in the regions of eastern Slavonia and west Syrmia. Total area of the county is 2,454 km2. Two major rivers run through the county, the Danube and the Sava, and two smaller rivers, the Bosut and the Vuka. The Bosut is a tributary of the Sava river, while the Vuka is a tributary of the Danube. Small Bosut tributaries within the water-land Spačva basin are Spačva and Studva. The county's highest point is Čukala, on the Fruška Gora, at 294 meters (965 ft), and its lowest point is on the Spačva River at 78 meters (256 ft) within the Spačva basin. Vukovar-Srijem County has a moderate continental climate, with a yearly average of 11 °C (52 °F).

The Vukovar-Srijem County borders the Osijek-Baranja County to the north and west, Brod-Posavina County to the west, Bosnian and Herzegovinian entity of Republika Srpska to the south and south-west and Brčko District to south, Posavina Canton to south-west and Serbian Srem District to south-east and South Bačka District to north-east. The Croatian Government has claims on the islands of Šarengrad and Vukovar on the Danube river, which are under Serbian control.

Demographics

The population of Vukovar-Srijem County at the time of 2011 Census was 179,521 making it the 7th most populous county of Croatia. Historically, the population was highest in 1991 when it peaked at little over 230 thousand inhabitants.

According to the 2001 census, Croats with 160,227 individuals constitute 78.27% of the county's entire population. Ethnic Serbs are the largest ethnic minority making 15.45% or 31,644 individuals. Other ethnic groups are Hungarians 2,047 (1%), Rusyns 1,796 (0.88%), Slovaks 1,338 (0.65%), Bosniaks 1,138 (0.54%). The largest Hungarian community is in Tordinci (18% of total population in the municipality), for Rusyns is Bogdanovci (23%), and for Bosniaks is Gunja (34%); while 78% of total Slovak population in the county live in Ilok.

Vukovar-Srijem County is according to the census data the county with the highest percentage of ethnic non-Croats in the entire country. Serbs are the largest minority community followed by Hungarians, Rusyns, Slovaks and Bosniaks. Historically large Yugoslav, Danube Swabians, Jewish, Vlachs, Turkish and other communities lived in the region. Census data on Roma in Croatia may not always be reliable due to stigma associated with free expression of ethnic identity in this community.

Area of modern-day Vukovar-Srijem County experienced number of spontaneous or state organized voluntary and involuntary waves of violent and peaceful emigration, immigration and politically motivated population persecution. Members of the same ethnic group in addition to social class may often distinguish themselves according to the time spent in the region (autochthonous or new and relatively new communities) and place of origin. Many of villages in the county are result of colonization. Among other, Austria-Hungary supported colonization of Mikluševci and Petrovci, Protestant Germans settled in Banovci, Kingdom of Yugoslavia supporting colonization of Karadžićevo, World War II puppet Independent State of Croatia established the village of Bokšić, Socialist Federal Republic of Yugoslavia supported resettlement of the World War II persecuted Serb communities from Bosnia-Herzegovina and Dalmatia in the region.

The Croatian War of Independence represent one of the last major demographic developments in the region. Croat communities were initially expelled from the self-proclaimed SAO Eastern Slavonia, Baranja and Western Syrmia. After the Operation Flash Serbian refugees from western Slavonia settled in the region yet majority of them together with some of the locals emigrated during and after the reintegration process. After the war Croatia state organized return of expelled Croats and provided housing for significant number of ethnic Croat refugees from Bosnian Posavina which became part of the Republika Srpska.

After the 2013 enlargement of the European Union all communities in the county were affected by significantly increased levels of emigration to Western Europe (Germany, Ireland, Austria, United Kingdom). Vukovar-Srijem County was one of the Croatian counties most directly exposed to European migrant crisis yet it served almost exclusively as a transit point. As a response to this development new permanent immigration center was open in the village of Tovarnik.

Minority populations

Serbs form majority population in municipalities of Negoslavci (97.19%), Markušica (90.10%) (Gaboš, Karadžićevo, Ostrovo, Podrinje), Trpinja (89.75%) (Bobota, Bršadin, Pačetin, Vera, Ludvinci) and Borovo (89.73%). Outside of these municipalities Serbs form majority in villages Banovci, Vinkovački Banovci, Orolik, Srijemske Laze and Mlaka Antinska. Serbian minority communities live in Vukovar, Mirkovci, Tovarnik, Stari Jankovci, Novi Jankovci, Ilok, Bogdanovci, Tompojevci and Vinkovci.

In the town of Vukovar and municipalities of Negoslavci, Markušica, Trpinja and Borovo, as well as in the villages of Banovci and Vinkovački Banovci, Serbian language and Serbian Cyrillic script is introduced in official use alongside Croatian.

There are in total 12 elementary schools with eight additional local schools and four secondary schools offering education in Serbian. A number of Serb minority organizations are centered in the county, including the Joint Council of Municipalities, the Independent Democratic Serb Party, and Radio Borovo.

There is one elementary school in Korođ offering education in Hungarian language.

The oldest mosque in Croatia in continuous use is Gunja Mosque located in the village of Gunja.

Politics 

Following the 2021 Croatian local elections the Assembly of the Vukovar-Srijem County is composed of 37 elected representatives. Out of a total of 145,082 eligible voters 72,587 (50.03%) participated in the elections and 72,558 (50.01%) submitted their ballots. There were 68,401 (94.27%) valid and 4,157 (5.73%) invalid ballots. The Croatian Democratic Union got 27,460 (40.14%) ballots and 16 elected representatives, the Homeland Movement got 16,072 ballots (23.49%) and nine elected representatives, the Bridge of Independent Lists with Croatian Sovereignists 8,755 ballots (12.79%) and five elected representatives, the Social Democratic Party of Croatia got 5,113 ballots (7.47%) and three elected representatives, the Independent Democratic Serb Party got 4,943 ballots (7.22%) and two elected representatives, and independent politician Tomislav Panenić's list got 3,664 ballots (5,35%) and two elected representatives. Ethnic Serb independent politician Dragan Crnogorac's list got 2,394 ballots (3.49%), which is below the 5% required to be assigned any seats in the Assembly.

|- style="background-color:#E9E9E9" align=center
!colspan=2|Party
!Votes
!%
!Seats
|-
| bgcolor=#4D4DFF|
|align=left valign=top|Croatian Democratic Union||27,460||40.14||16 
|-
| width=5px bgcolor=#555555|
|align=left valign=top|Homeland Movement||16,072 ||23.49||9
|-
| bgcolor=#D44500|
|align=left valign=top|Bridge of Independent Lists & Croatian Sovereignists||8,755||12.79||5
|-
| bgcolor=#E60026|
|align=left valign=top|Social Democratic Party of Croatia||5,113||7.47||3
|-
| bgcolor=#89CFF0|
|align=left valign=top|Independent Democratic Serb Party||4,943||7.22||2
|-
| bgcolor=#74C365|
|align=left valign=top|Independent politician Tomislav Panenić's list||3,664||5.35||2
|-
| bgcolor=#C3B091|
|align=left valign=top|Independent politician Dragan Crnogorac's list||2,394||3.49||0
|-
|align=left colspan=2|Invalid/blank votes||4,157|| 5.73||—
|-
|align=left colspan=2|Total||72,558||100||—
|-
|align=left colspan=2|Registered voters/turnout||145,082||50.01||—
|-
|align=left colspan=8|

|-
|align=left colspan=8|Source: 
|}

Towns and municipalities
Vukovar-Srijem County has 85 settlements, and is divided into five towns and 26 municipalities.

See also
Syrmia County of the Kingdom of Croatia-Slavonia

References

External links

 Vukovar-Syrmia County
 Vukovar-Srijem County tourist organization

 
Counties of Croatia